Etter Rubicon is a 1987 Norwegian thriller film directed by Leidulv Risan and starring Sverre Anker Ousdal and Toralv Maurstad. It was produced by Dag Alveberg and the film company Filmeffekt. The film is a political commentary about the Cold War and follows the aftermath of two children dying after a military exercise off the coast of Nordland and Troms.

Cast
Sverre Anker Ousdal as Jon Hoff
Ewa Carlsson as Mona Axsen
Ellen Horn as Maria Hamarøy
Toralv Maurstad as Carl Berntsen
Jack Fjeldstad as Thorvald Hoff
Alf Malland as Arne Michelsen
Jan Hårstad as Johnsen
Bjørn Sundquist as Journalist Elvenes
Christian Sampson as Martin Hamarøy
Stein Erik Skattum as Tom Hamarøy
John Ausland as Amerikan officer

References

External links
 

1987 films
Cold War films
Norwegian thriller films
1980s Norwegian-language films
1987 establishments in Norway
Films set in Norway